Lost in the Translation is an album by American composer Bill Laswell, issued under the moniker Axiom Ambient. It was released on November 8, 1994 by Axiom.

Track listing

Personnel 
Adapted from the Lost in the Translation liner notes.
Musicians
Tetsu Inoue – effects ("Ruins")
Bill Laswell – effects, producer
The Orb – effects ("Aum")
Terre Thaemlitz – effects ("Eternal Drift")

Technical
Layng Martine – assistant engineer
Robert Musso – engineering
Shinro Ohtake – cover art

Release history

References

External links 
 
 Lost in the Translation at Bandcamp

1994 albums
Bill Laswell albums
Albums produced by Bill Laswell
Axiom (record label) albums